West Virginia's 2012 general elections were held on November 6, 2012. Primary elections were held on May 8, 2012.

Federal

Senate

Incumbent Democratic U.S. Senator Joe Manchin, was re-elected, defeating token opposition in the primary, and then perennial candidate John Raese, a businessman and four-time Republican nominee for the Senate (including a challenge to Manchin in 2010), with 61% of the vote.

House of Representatives

1st congressional district

Republican incumbent David McKinley, who has represented the 1st district since 2011, easily won re-election, defeating Sue Thorn, a "community organizer", receiving 62% of the vote.

2nd congressional district

Republican incumbent Shelley Moore Capito, who has represented the 2nd district since 2001, easily won re-election. She defeated Michael Davis and state Delegate Jonathan Miller in the Republican primary. and then Howard Swint, a union official, receiving 70% of the vote.

3rd congressional district

Democratic incumbent Nick Rahall, who has represented the 3rd district since 1993 (and previously represented the 4th district from 1977 to 1993) won reelection in a close race (by the standard of that district, where many counties have not elected a Republican to any office in over 80 years), defeating State Delegate Rick Snuffer, who unsuccessfully challenged Rahall as the Republican nominee in 2004, with only 54% of the vote.

State

Constitutional officers

Governor

Incumbent Democratic Governor Earl Ray Tomblin, who has held the position since 2010, won a full term in his own right, defeating Bill Maloney, a businessman who ran as the Republican nominee in the aforementioned 2011 special election. and two minor party candidates, winning 50% of the vote to 46%, with the minor party candidates receiving the remainder.

The results give automatic ballot access for the next four years to both the Mountain Party, (a "green" party); and the Libertarian Party, as ballot access is based on getting 1% of the vote for governor.

Secretary of State
Democratic incumbent Natalie Tennant, was re-elected easily, receiving 62% of the vote over Brian Savilla.  She received by far the most votes of any statewide candidate.

Attorney General
Democratic incumbent Darrell McGraw was defeated by  Patrick Morrisey, a lawyer specializing in health care matters, 51% to 49%.

Treasurer
Democratic incumbent John Perdue, won reelection over State Senate Minority Leader Mike Hall.

Auditor
Democratic incumbent Glen Gainer III, won re-election over former state Delegate Larry Faircloth.

Commissioner of Agriculture
Democratic incumbent Gus Douglass, who has held the position of state Agriculture Commissioner since 1993 (and previously held the position from 1965 to 1989), decided to retire.

State Senator Walt Helmick sought and received the Democratic nomination to succeed Douglass. He defeated Joe Messineo, a former agricultural field supervisor for the state Department of Agriculture and the USDA; Steve Miller, an assistant state Agriculture Commissioner; Sally Shepherd, a farmer; and, Bob Tabb, the deputy state Agriculture Commissioner and former state Delegate.

Kent Leonhardt, a farmer and retired Marine lieutenant colonel, received the Republican nomination. Mike Teets, a cattleman who unsuccessfully challenged Douglass in 2008, has planned to run but dropped out of the race in February 2012.

Helmick defeated Leonhardt with 52% of the vote.

Legislature

State Senate
17 of the 34 members of the West Virginia Senate were up for election. The state Senate consisted of 28 Democrats and 6 Republicans.  This was the first election after the redistricting following the 2010 Census.

Democrats won 11 of the 17 races.  With the carryover seats the Democrats retained control of the State Senate 23 to 11.

State House of Delegates
All 100 members of the West Virginia House of Delegates were up for election. The state House previously consisted of 65 Democrats and 35 Republicans.  This likewise was the first election following the redistricting, with the House districts changed more than those of the Senate.  Democrats won only 55 of the 100 races, making the new balance of power 55-45, the best showing for Republicans since the party shift of 1932.

Supreme Court
Two seats were up for election on the state Supreme Court of Appeals.  The electoral system requires voters to "vote for no more than two" in a single election, rather than electing each seat separately.   Both seats were held by Democrats.

Justice Robin Jean Davis, who was first elected in 2000, ran for re-election, while Justice Thomas McHugh, kept his pledge to not seek a full term.  McHugh had previously served on the court from 1980 to 1997, and was appointed and then elected to an unexpired term in 2008.

Davis faced Wood County Circuit Judge J.D. Beane; Letitia Neese Chafin, a lawyer and wife of state Senator H. Truman Chafin; Louis Palmer, a Supreme Court clerk; H. John "Buck" Rogers, a lawyer; and, Greenbrier County Circuit Judge Jim Rowe, in the Democratic primary. Chafin and Davis received the Democratic nomination.

Allen Loughry, a law clerk for Democrat Supreme Court Justice Margaret Workman, and Jefferson County Circuit Judge John Yoder sought and received the Republican nomination as they were the only two Republican candidates in the primary.

Davis was re-elected, while Allen Loughry was elected to his first term in office. With the election of Loughry, the court has two elected Republicans sitting on the bench for the first time since 1940.

References

External links
Elections Division at the West Virginia Secretary of State
West Virginia at Ballotpedia
West Virginia judicial elections, 2012 at Judgepedia
West Virginia 2012 campaign finance data from OpenSecrets
West Virginia Congressional Races in 2012 campaign finance data from OpenSecrets
Outside spending at the Sunlight Foundation

 
West Virginia